The Ambassador of the United Kingdom to Finland is the United Kingdom's foremost diplomatic representative in the Republic of Finland, and head of the UK's diplomatic mission there. The official title is His Britannic Majesty's Ambassador to the Republic of Finland.

Heads of mission

Chargés d'affaires
1919: Henry Bell
1919: Coleridge Kennard

Ambassadors
1919–1920: The Lord Alton
1920–1921: George Kidston
1921–1930: Sir Ernest Rennie
1930–1935: Sir Rowland Sperling
1935–1937: Herbert Grant Watson
1937–1940: Thomas Snow
1940–1941: Sir George Vereker
1941–1944: No representation due to Continuation War
1944–1947: Sir Francis Shepherd
1947–1951: Sir Oswald Scott
1951–1954: Sir Andrew Noble
1954–1958: Michael Cresswell
1958–1961: Sir Douglas Busk
1961–1963: Sir Con O'Neill
1963–1966: Sir Anthony Lambert
1966–1969: Sir David Scott Fox
1969–1972: Bernard Ledwidge
1972–1975: Anthony Elliott
1975–1980: James Cable
1980–1983: Andrew Stuart
1983–1986: Alan Brooke Turner
1986–1989: [Justin Staples]
1989–1995: Neil Smith
1995–1997: David Burns
1997–2000: Gavin Hewitt
2000–2002: Alyson Bailes
2002–2006: Matthew Kirk
2006–2010: Valerie Caton
2010–2014: Matthew Lodge
2014–2017: Sarah Price
2018–2021: Tom Dodd

-present:  Theresa Bubbear

References

External links
UK and Finland, gov.uk
Previous Ambassadors, UK in Helsinki, 8 September 2010, via archive.org

Finland
 
United Kingdom